Ursina can refer to:
860 Ursina, a minor planet orbiting the Sun.
Ursina, Pennsylvania, a borough in Somerset County, Pennsylvania, United States.
Vrsno, Kobarid, a village in western Slovenia, named Ursina in Italian